Cane Ridge Meeting House is a historic church building on Cane Ridge near Paris, Kentucky built in 1791.  It is one of the oldest church buildings in Kentucky and the largest one room log structure.  The church was the site of a large frontier Christian revival in 1801 hosted by the local Presbyterian congregation that met in the building. Nearly 10,000 people attending.  According to the museum  "[i]n 1804, a small group of Presbyterian ministers from Kentucky and Ohio... penned and signed a document, "The Last Will and Testament of the Springfield Presbytery", at Cane Ridge that resulted in the birth of a movement seeking unity among Christians along non-sectarian lines. They would call themselves simply "Christians.  The Christian Church (Disciples of Christ), the Churches of Christ (non-instrumental), and the Christian Churches (independent) of the Stone-Campbell movement trace their origins here. This movement is often noted as the first one indigenous to American soil."
In the 1930s a stone building was constructed around the original log structure.  The church is still used for worship.

Images

See also

 List of the oldest churches in the United States
 List of the oldest buildings in Kentucky

References

External links
 The official website of Cane Ridge

Presbyterian churches in Kentucky
Churches completed in 1791
18th-century Presbyterian church buildings in the United States
Restoration Movement
Religious museums in Kentucky
Museums in Bourbon County, Kentucky
History museums in Kentucky